The Rathaus-Glockenspiel in Munich is a tourist attraction clock in Marienplatz, the heart of Munich, Germany.

History 
Part of the second construction phase of the New Town Hall, it dates from 1908. Every day at 11 a.m. and 12 p.m. (as well as 5 p.m. in the summer) it chimes and re-enacts two stories from the 16th century to the amusement of mass crowds of tourists and locals. It consists of 43 bells and 32 life-sized figures. The top half of the Glockenspiel tells the story of the marriage of the local Duke Wilhelm V (who also founded the noted Hofbräuhaus) to Renata of Lorraine. In honor of the happy couple there is a joust with life-sized knights on horseback representing Bavaria (in white and blue) and Lothringen (in red and white). The Bavarian knight wins every time, of course.

This is then followed by the bottom half and second story: Schäfflertanz (the coopers' dance). According to myth, 1517 was a year of plague in Munich. The coopers are said to have danced through the streets to "bring fresh vitality to fearful dispositions." The coopers remained loyal to the duke, and their dance came to symbolize perseverance and loyalty to authority through difficult times. By tradition, the dance is performed in Munich every seven years. This was described in 1700 as "an age-old custom", but the current dance was defined only in 1871. The dance can be seen during Fasching (German Carnival): the latest one is in 2019.

The whole show lasts somewhere between 12 and 15 minutes long depending on which tune it plays that day. At the very end of the show, a very small golden rooster at the top of the Glockenspiel chirps quietly three times, marking the end of the spectacle.

References

 Muenchener Stadtmuseum Guidebook

External links 

 An illustrated story about the Glockenspiel
 Waiting on the Glockenspiel

Tourist attractions in Munich
Clocks in Germany

de:Neues Rathaus (München)#Glockenspiel und Nachtw.C3.A4chter mit Engel